Edoardo Pierozzi (born 12 September 2001) is an Italian professional footballer who plays for  club Como, on loan from Fiorentina.

Club career
He was raised in the youth system of Fiorentina.

On 31 August 2020, he joined Serie C club Pistoiese on loan for the 2020–21 season.

He made his professional Serie C debut for Pistoiese on 27 September 2020 in a game against Alessandria. He established himself as a regular starter with Pistoiese. He scored his first professional goal on 8 November 2020 in a 1–0 defeat of Pontedera.

On 19 July 2021, he moved to Alessandria.

On 29 July 2022, Pierozzi was loaned by Fiorentina to Palermo, with an option to buy. After making only two appearances with the Rosanero in the first half of the season, Pierozzi's loan was cut short, with the player moving to fellow Serie B club Como on 12 January 2023.

International career
He was first called up to represent his country in February 2019 for Under-18 friendlies. Later same year, he played in the Under-19 Euro qualifiers, the final tournament was eventually cancelled due to the COVID-19 pandemic in Europe.

Personal life
Pierozzi's twin brother, Niccolò, is a professional footballer as well; the two played together during their youth team years at Fiorentina.

References

External links
 

2001 births
Footballers from Florence
Living people
Italian footballers
Italy youth international footballers
Association football defenders
U.S. Pistoiese 1921 players
U.S. Alessandria Calcio 1912 players
Palermo F.C. players
Como 1907 players
Serie C players
Serie B players